Mount Sicapoo (sā-kā-pöö', jokingly said to be derived from 'Suko Na Po', meaning 'I Give Up') is a mountain in the Cordillera Central of Ilocos Norte & Abra, Luzon, northern Philippines. It is the highest point in Ilocos Norte. Located to the south of Mount Kilang, to the southeast of Laoag and to the east of the Padsan River. The mountain is heavily forested with pine trees.

Ascents of the mountain begin at the Gasgas River in nearby Solsona and initially lead to the campsite at Saulay, before moving to Bubuos and Pakpako campsmmites. Due to its steep cliffs in places, particularly approaching the summit, it is considered highly treacherous and exceptionally difficult to climb. Sicapoo wasn't fully ascended until 2009.

In October 2016, when Typhoon Haima broke out, the mountain played a role in diminishing its power as it headed towards China, though it remained a Category 1 Typhoon.

References

Sicapoo
Landforms of Ilocos Norte